Seattle riots  may refer to:

Seattle riot of 1886
WTO Ministerial Conference of 1999 protest activity
Seattle Mardi Gras riots
George Floyd protests in Seattle